Jean-Louis Verdier (2 February 1935 – 25 August 1989) was a French mathematician who worked, under the guidance of his doctoral advisor Alexander Grothendieck, on derived categories and Verdier duality. He was a close collaborator of Grothendieck, notably contributing to SGA 4 his theory of hypercovers and anticipating the later development of étale homotopy by Michael Artin and Barry Mazur, following a suggestion he attributed to Pierre Cartier. Saul Lubkin's related theory of rigid hypercovers was later taken up by Eric Friedlander in his definition of the étale topological type.

Verdier was a student at the elite École Normale Supérieure in Paris, and later became director of studies there, as well as a Professor at the University of Paris VII. For many years he directed a joint seminar at the École Normale Supérieure with Adrien Douady. Verdier was a member of Bourbaki. In 1984 he was the president of the Société Mathématique de France.

In 1976 Verdier developed a useful regularity condition on stratified sets that the Chinese-Australian mathematician Tzee-Char Kuo had previously shown implied the Whitney conditions for subanalytic sets (such as real or complex analytic varieties). Verdier called the condition (w) for Whitney, as at the time he thought (w) might be equivalent to Whitney's condition (b). Real algebraic examples for which the Whitney conditions (b) hold but Verdier's condition (w) fails, were constructed by David Trotman who has obtained many geometric properties of (w)-regular stratifications. Work of Bernard Teissier, aided by Jean-Pierre Henry and Michel Merle at the École Polytechnique, led to the 1982 result that Verdier's condition (w) is equivalent to the Whitney conditions for complex analytic stratifications.

Verdier later worked on the theory of integrable systems.

Bibliography 
 Verdier's 1967 thesis, published belatedly in:

Part of it also appears in SGA 4½ as the last chapter, "Catégories dérivées (état 0)".
 
 Integrable Systems, The Verdier Memorial Conference (Actes du Colloque International de Luminy, 1991), Progress in Mathematics 115, edited by O. Babelon, P. Cartier, Y. Kosmann-Schwarzbach, Birkhäuser, 1993.

See also
Artin–Verdier duality

References

External links 
 

1935 births
1989 deaths
École Normale Supérieure alumni
20th-century French mathematicians
University of Paris alumni
Academic staff of the University of Paris
Nicolas Bourbaki